The pianist Alfred Brendel KBE (born 5 January 1931) was a recording artist for more than half a century, from his first record of Prokofiev's Piano Concerto No. 5 at the age of 21, to his farewell concerts in 2008, recorded in Hanover and Vienna. He has recorded with only three record companies: Vox Records, Decca and Philips. His discography contains many albums and compilations of multiple recordings from different composers featuring him as a pianist.

Overview
Alfred Brendel made his first recording at the age of 21 and has since recorded a wide range of piano repertoire. He was the first pianist ever to record the complete solo piano works of Beethoven. He has also recorded works by Mozart, Liszt, Brahms, Schumann and Schubert. In contemporary music he has recorded the piano concerto op.42 by Schoenberg, the piano sonata by Alban Berg, etc.

Brendel recorded extensively for the VOX label, providing them his first of three sets of the complete Beethoven sonatas. He did not secure a major recording contract until the 1970s. His breakthrough came after a recital of Beethoven at the Queen Elizabeth Hall in London; the day after, three major record labels called his agent. Since the 1970s, Brendel has recorded for Philips Classics.

Partial Discography

Albums

Compilations

Boxed Sets

Video Releases

References

General

Alfred Brendel's Official Site
A more comprehensive listing of Brendel recordings.

Specific

Discographies of classical pianists
Discographies of Austrian artists